Harold Ellis "Moose" Watson (July 14, 1898 — September 11, 1957) was a Canadian amateur ice hockey player. He was a member of the Toronto Granites team that won a gold medal for Canada in ice hockey at the 1924 Winter Olympics.

Early years
Born in St. John's, Newfoundland, Watson also lived in England and Winnipeg, Manitoba before moving to Toronto at the age of 15. He played for the Whitby Athletics in the Ontario Hockey Association. He then played for St. Andrews College and was a first team all-star in 1915. Watson played for the Toronto Aura Lee before serving in the Canadian military during World War I.

Royal Flying Corps
He enlisted in the Royal Flying Corps in 1917 and served in the First World War, becoming a fighter ace. He flew a Royal Aircraft Factory SE.5a to victory over an Albatros D.V on 25 January 1918, sharing the win with fellow Canadian Frank H. Taylor. By the time he scored his sixth and final win on 4 July, he had destroyed another enemy plane and sent four more down out of control.

Playing career
After the war, Watson joined the Toronto Dentals in a playoff series against the Hamilton Tigers, which the Tigers won. For the 1919–20 season, he joined the new Toronto Granites, the OHA team from the Toronto Granite Club. Led by Watson, the Granites won the Allan Cup in 1921–22 and 1922–23, with Watson named a first-team all-star in both seasons. They then represented Canada at the 1924 Winter Olympics, winning the ice hockey gold medal. At the Olympics, Watson scored 36 goals in five games as the Canadian team outscored the opposition 132-3 over six games. In one game against Switzerland, Watson scored 13 goals.

He turned down several lucrative offers to play professionally in the National Hockey League. Charlie Querrie, manager of the Toronto St. Patricks, offered Watson $10,000 to join his team for the 1924–25 season, but Watson declined. His Granites teammate Hooley Smith would have a 17-year NHL career, but Watson wanted to enter the business world and retired as a player in 1924.

Coaching career
In 1930, he became coach of the Toronto National Sea Fleas senior amateur team. During the 1931 playoff season, Watson refereed several OHA games. In December 1931, during his second season behind the bench for the Sea Fleas, Watson made a brief comeback as a player at the age of 33 after one of his players was unable to make a road trip. As coach, Watson guided the team to the Allan Cup in 1932.

Honours
Watson was inducted into the Hockey Hall of Fame in 1962 and the IIHF Hall of Fame in 1998.

References

External links

Harry Watson at Sports-Reference 

1898 births
1957 deaths
Canadian ice hockey forwards
Canadian World War I flying aces
Hockey Hall of Fame inductees
Ice hockey people from Newfoundland and Labrador
Ice hockey players at the 1924 Winter Olympics
IIHF Hall of Fame inductees
Medalists at the 1924 Winter Olympics
Olympic gold medalists for Canada
Olympic ice hockey players of Canada
Olympic medalists in ice hockey
Sportspeople from St. John's, Newfoundland and Labrador